The Setzehorn is a mountain of the Bernese Alps, located north of Bellwald in the canton of Valais. It lies south of the Galmihorn, on the range lying between the Fiescher Glacier and the main Rhone valley.

References

External links
 Setzehorn on Hikr

Mountains of the Alps
Alpine three-thousanders
Mountains of Switzerland
Mountains of Valais